Blake Carrington Wesley (born March 16, 2003) is an American professional basketball player for the San Antonio Spurs of the National Basketball Association (NBA). He played college basketball for the Notre Dame Fighting Irish.

High school career
Wesley played for James Whitcomb Riley High School in South Bend, Indiana. As a junior, he averaged 26 points and 6.3 rebounds per game. In his senior season, Wesley averaged 27.1 points, 6.1 rebounds and 2.5 steals per game, leading Riley to the Class 4A sectional title. He was named to the Indiana All-Star team.

Recruiting
Wesley was a consensus four-star recruit. On November 20, 2020, he committed to playing college basketball for Notre Dame, choosing the Fighting Irish over offers from Creighton, Kansas State, Louisville, Maryland, Purdue and Xavier.

College career
Wesley had an immediate impact during his freshman season at Notre Dame, and analysts began to consider him a first-round 2022 NBA draft prospect. In his college debut on November 13, 2021, he scored 21 points in a 68–52 win over Cal State Northridge. On November 29, 2021, Wesley scored a career-high 24 points in an 82–72 loss to Illinois. He was named to the Second Team All-ACC as well as the All-Rookie Team. As a freshman, Wesley averaged 14.4 points, 3.7 rebounds and 2.4 assists per game. On March 30, 2022, he declared for the 2022 NBA draft, forgoing his remaining college eligibility.

Professional career

San Antonio Spurs (2022−present)
On June 23, 2022, Wesley was selected with the 25th pick in the 2022 NBA draft by the San Antonio Spurs. Wesley joined the Spurs' 2022 NBA Summer League roster. In his Summer League debut, Wesley scored twenty points and five assists in a 90–99 loss against the Cleveland Cavaliers. On July 5, 2022, Wesley signed a rookie-scale contract with the Spurs. Wesley made his NBA debut on October 28, 2022, scoring 10 points and 4 assists in a 129–124 win against the Chicago Bulls. Two days later, in his second career game, Wesley tore his left MCL when he collided with Jaden McDaniels during the second quarter. Wesley was assigned to the Austin Spurs on December 16, and returned to game action less than 7 weeks after his injury, scoring 12 points in a 112–102 loss to the Capitanes de Ciudad de México on December 16.

Career statistics

College

|-
| style="text-align:left;"| 2021–22
| style="text-align:left;"| Notre Dame
| 35 || 28 || 29.3 || .404 || .303 || .657 || 3.7 || 2.4 || 1.3 || .1 || 14.4

References

External links

Notre Dame Fighting Irish bio

2003 births
Living people
American men's basketball players
Austin Spurs players
Basketball players from South Bend, Indiana
Notre Dame Fighting Irish men's basketball players
San Antonio Spurs draft picks
San Antonio Spurs players
Shooting guards